The Chatterjee International Center (CIC) is the name of a high-rise building located in the Indian metropolis of Kolkata. It is located on Chowringhee Road in the Central Business District of the city. As of July 2012, it is the fifth-tallest building in Kolkata.

History 
The Chatterjee International Center is one of the oldest high-rises in Kolkata. It was completed in 1976. It is also the first twenty-floor-plus building in eastern India. Upon its completion, it was one of the tallest buildings in the country. Recently, a makeover of the building has been completed. It is an office building.

See also
List of tallest buildings in Kolkata

References

Office buildings in Kolkata
1976 establishments in West Bengal
Skyscraper office buildings in India